Kast alle papirene is the ninth studio album by Norwegian rock band deLillos. It included a bonus CD with live tracks and the Tyve null tre track.

Track listing
"Merkelig balanse"
"Nå vil vi til Sverige"
"Torkel Ravndal"
"Kom igjen"
"Seng"
"Familiepappa"
"Egoland"
"Gal"
"Sorgen er en gledens venn"
"Brød"
"Kast alle papirene"
"Guddommelig plikt"

Bonus disc:
"Tyve null tre"
"Brød (live)"
"Hjernen er alene (live)"
"God natt (live)"
"Livet er en liten dings (live)"

1999 albums
DeLillos albums
Sonet Records albums